Catholicate College, Pathanamthitta, established in 1952, is an institution of higher education at Pathanamthitta of Kerala, India. Catholicate College belongs to the first group of colleges in Kerala to receive academic accreditation from the National Assessment and Accreditation Council (NAAC). In the third phase of (NAAC) re-accreditation, the college has been re-accredited by NAAC in A+ grade with CGPA of 3.60. The college  is owned by Malankara Orthodox Church, founded by Catholicos Moran Mar Baselios Geevarghese II. The college was originally planned by Geevarghese Mar Philoxenos, Metropolitan; it was founded in 1952, after his death, by Daniel Mar Philoxenos Metropolitan, who became the first principal of the college.

The Principal is Dr. Philipose Omman from the Department of Botany. The college is affiliated to Mahatma Gandhi University, Kottayam.

Academics
The college has 2,000 students. It has 110 teaching and 67 administrative staff on its rolls. There are degree courses in English, Malayalam, Hindi, Economics, History, Mathematics, Physics, Chemistry, Botany, Zoology and Commerce. The college has research facilities in the departments of Malayalam, Hindi, Zoology, Botany, Physics and Mathematics.

The college has a study center of the Indira Gandhi National Open University.

Donations
NSS, Bhoomitrasena club and staff club of the college donated 14 houses to the poor.

Awards
 The college secured Best College state award from the government of Kerala for motivating students for blood donations.
 The college got Best college award from the corporate management of MOC colleges for its overall performance.

Courses
The college has four UGC-sponsored career oriented add-on courses:
 Computer Technology (Department Of Physics)
 Video Production and Science Communication (Department Of Chemistry)
 Lab Technology Medical (Department Of Zoology)
 Yoga & Stress Management (Department Of Physical Education)

The Physics department has two US-based student chapters: 
 S P I E (Society of Photo optical Instrumentation Engineers)
 O.S.A (Optical society of America)

The college has an A accreditation from NAAC (as per revision in 2016)

Principals

 Daniel Mar Philexinos Metropolitan (P.E. Daniel Ramban) was the first principal. (1952–53)
 Dr. N. M. Zernov, Britain (1953–54)
 Prof. Peter S. Wright, Britain (1954–55)
 Prof. Ninan Abraham (1955–57)
 Prof. Puthencavu Mathen Tharakan (1957–58)
 Prof. E. T. Mathew (1958–59)
 Prof. T. B. Ninan (1959–61)
 Dr. J. Alexander (1963–75)
 Prof. V. T. Thomas (1975–76)
 Prof. C. N. Mathew (1976)
 Dr. Paul C. Varghese (1976–83)
 Prof. N.G.Kunjachen (1983)
 Dr. T. A. George (1983–92)
 Prof. V. I. Joseph (1992–93)
 Dr. K.C John (1993–99)
 Prof. E. Jacob John (1999–2001)
 Prof. Abraham George (2001–2002)
 Fr. Dr. K T Mathewkutty (2002–2005)
 Prof. Prasad Thomas (2005–2006)
 Dr. George Eapen (2006–2007)
 Dr. Saramma Varghese (2007–2010)
 Dr. George Varghese Koppara (2010- 2014)
 Dr. Mathew P Joseph (2014- 2021)
 Dr. Philipose Omman (2021- Present)

Departments
 English
 Malayalam

 Hindi
 Syriac

 Commerce

 Mathematics
 Physics
 Chemistry
 Botany
 Zoology
 Physical Education

Courses

Postgraduate courses
M. A. 
 English
 English (Integrated)  
 Malayalam
 Hindi 
 History
 Econometrics

M.Sc.
 Mathematics 
 Physics- Electronics 
 Physics-Material Science
 Chemistry- Polymer Chemistry
 Chemistry- Analytical Chemistry
 Botany- Biotechnology-Elective
 Zoology

M.Com.
 Financial Management (Aided) 
 Financial Management (self financing) 
 MTA (self financing) (Master of Tourism Administration)

B.A.

B.Sc.

B.Com.

|-

Ph.D. courses
 Malayalam
 Hindi 
 Zoology
 Botany 
 Political Science 
 Physics 
 Mathematics 
 English

Notable alumni
 Padma Shri Thekkethil Kochandy Alex
 Captain Raju, actor
 Benyamin, writer
 S. Ramesan Nair, lyricist and poet

Notable faculty
 Veena George, Minister for Health & Family Welfare, Government of Kerala

External links
Catholicate College website
Alumni Association, Kuwait
Alumni Association, Dubai
Government of Kerala colleges list
https://web.archive.org/web/20171107170506/http://www.asishinside.com/search/label/catholicate

References

Christian universities and colleges in India
Arts and Science colleges in Kerala
Colleges affiliated to Mahatma Gandhi University, Kerala
Malankara Orthodox Syrian church buildings
Catholicate College Pathanamthitta
Education in Pathanamthitta
Educational institutions established in 1952
1952 establishments in India
List of colleges affiliated with Mahatma Gandhi University, Kerala#Art and Sciences